Curgurrell is a hamlet on the Roseland Peninsula north of Portscatho in Cornwall, England. Dingerein Castle, an Iron Age fort, is nearby. At the 2011 census, the population was included in the civil parish of Gerrans.

References

Hamlets in Cornwall